Viburnum obovatum, the small-leaf viburnum, is a plant in the genus Viburnum within the muskroot family, Adoxaceae.

References

obovatum
Flora of the Southeastern United States